Ridley Bridge is a stone arch road bridge over the River South Tyne near Ridley Hall in Northumberland.

History
This stone arch bridge was designed by Robert Mylne and constructed in 1792. It has been listed Grade II* by Historic England.

References

Bridges in Northumberland
Crossings of the River Tyne
Grade II* listed bridges in England
Grade II* listed buildings in Northumberland